Šatov is a market town in Znojmo District in the South Moravian Region of the Czech Republic. It has about 1,100 inhabitants.

Notable people
Hellmut Diwald (1924–1993), German historian

Twin towns – sister cities

Šatov is twinned with:
 Semerovo, Slovakia

References

Populated places in Znojmo District
Market towns in the Czech Republic